The 1982 Australian Formula 2 Championship was a CAMS sanctioned Australian motor racing title open to cars complying with Australian Formula 2. The title, which was the 15th Australian Formula 2 Championship, was won by Lucio Cesario driving a Ralt RT3 Volkswagen.

Calendar
The championship was contested over a five round series.

Points system
Championship points were awarded on a 9-6-4-3-2-1 basis to the top six placegetters in each round. 

Where rounds were contested over two heats, points were allocated on a 20-16-13-11-10-9-8-7-6-5-4-3-2-1 basis for the first 14 positions in each race. These points were then aggregated to determine the first six round positions for the purpose of championship points allocation.

Championship results

References

External links
 CAMS Online Manual of Motor Sport

Australian Formula 2 Championship
Formula 2 Championship